A dance pad, also known as a dance mat or dance platform, is a flat electronic game controller used for input in dance games. Most dance pads are divided into a 3×3 matrix of square panels for the player to stand on, with some or all of the panels corresponding to directions or actions within the game. Some dance pads also have extra buttons outside the main stepping area, such as "Start" and "Select". Pairs of dance pads often are joined, side by side, for certain gameplay modes.

Popular arcade games such as Dance Dance Revolution, In the Groove, Pump It Up, and StepManiaX use large steel dance platforms connected to the arcade cabinet, whereas versions for home consoles usually use smaller (often flexible) plastic pads. These home pads are specifically made for systems such as the GameCube, Wii, Dreamcast (Japan only), PlayStation, PlayStation 2 and Xbox, but can also be used in computer simulators such as StepMania through the use of special adapters.

Types

Soft

"Soft" pads are thin and made of plastic. They generally cost $10–$20 USD. They are good for beginners to dance games or casual use, but they have a tendency to move around and wrinkle up during gameplay (unless "modded", such as by gluing or taping them to the top of a piece of plywood or the bottom of a transparent office chair mat). They are not usually durable and may wear out easily, but for light use they are quite suitable. Manufacturers of soft pads include Konami, BNSUSA, RedOctane, Intec, Mad Catz (Beat Pad), MyMyBox, Naki International, and Nintendo (Action Pad). OEM manufacturers include Topway (manufacturer of RedOctane pads), Futime, and many others.

Some soft pads contain stiff foam inserts of the dense or hard varieties to provide more stability and durability. The inserts usually ship as three or six puzzle pieces (to allow for a smaller box) which fit together using a dovetail joint and slide into the dance pad, which then zips closed around the foam. Certain brands of foam pads put raised plastic sections under the directional buttons to allow them to be more easily felt by a player's feet, so as to help keep them centered on the pad. These pads generally cost between $40 and $100.

It is also possible to modify a pad by attaching it to a hard surface and optionally covering it with clear material; this can increase pad life and keep it from slipping around.

Hard  
[[File:Dance Dance Revolution 4thMix Plus arcade machine stage.jpg|200px|thumb|right|The arcade version of Dance Dance Revolutions two-player dance platform is an example of a hard pad.]]"Hard" pads are usually constructed with metal (and sometimes wood) for durability, and usually come with a raised bar behind the player. Arcade machines use very durable metal pads that are designed for heavy use. Other hard pads can be purchased for home use with a video game system; the prices can be around US$100 to $350 ($200–$600 for double pads) - $700 to $1000+ online. Manufacturers of hard pads include DDRgame, Cobalt Flux, MyMyBox, Brown Box, RedOctane (ceased production as of February 2010 due to company termination) and Naki International.

Hard pads are used in all arcade versions of music games that employ dance pads, and often serve as the nec plus ultra for DIY Gamers that attempt to construct "Homebrew pads." Many Homebrew kits are ultimately instruction guides for converting soft pads into hard pads, although Homebrew hard pads often feature additional functions such as additional inputs (see below).

 Solid State "Solid State" pads''' replace the usual mechanical switch and contact used in other hard pads. A proximity sensor is used to detect a player's steps on the pad. The advantages of a solid state design is that they do not require pressure to activate, eliminating moving parts that might break down and keeping dirt from getting into the mechanism.

 Caveats 
Problems are often encountered when attempting to use a PlayStation pad with a computer simulator. Most PlayStation-PC adapters will not register Up and Down, or Left and Right, simultaneously initially, although they are common "jumps" in dance games. This is because normal PlayStation games do not require such input, and because D-pads are not usually designed to physically permit such input. StepMania's website has a section concerning adapter compatibility. Although these devices may work on a PC, to date, the adapters will not work with consoles that have built in USB ports such as the PlayStation 3 and the Xbox 360.

Purchasers of home pads should be aware of the number and arrangement of active arrow panels that are required by the game(s) they want to play. Although most commercial pads have four arrow panels (DDR/In The Groove), some have five (Pump It Up), six (Dance Dance Revolution Solo 2000), eight (Dance:UK), (MC Groovz Dance Craze), or nine (Technomotion).

Homebrew pads

Not satisfied with the cost and/or reliability of factory assembled metal dance pads, many players construct their own dance pad. Using common materials (such as plywood, sheet metal, and acrylic glass or polycarbonate) found at local hardware stores, do-it-yourselfers are able to construct a pad that is often much more durable and more authentic-feeling than commercially built hard pads. Some homebrew pads have extra features such as additional arrows (for playing Pump It Up or DDR Solo), menu switches and pushbuttons, and bars. Furthermore, the homebrew pads are easier to repair because they use common parts, and are usually designed for easy disassembly.

While some homebrew pads use custom electronics built from scratch, most homebrew pads make use a circuit board from a standard controller to simplify the process of interfacing the pad with a gaming system. The controller used depends on the system that the pad is intended to be played with (GameCube, PlayStation, Xbox, or PC).

Homebrew pads use a variety of technologies for designing the arrows that the player is supposed to step on. The most common design uses metal contacts that sandwich together when the player steps on the pad or arcade button switches but some novel ideas have been proposed such as the use of optical, pressure, vibration, or proximity sensors.

Due to the amount of work needed to create a custom metal pad, some players instead opt to modify their existing soft pads. Most of the time, players will sometimes take plywood sheets, acrylic, or office chair floor protectors and staple it to their soft pads. This effectively cures wrinkling and makes the pad more durable to use while wearing shoes.

Educational use

A dance pad has been also used in experimental systems for navigating through virtual environments, such as those reproducing historical buildings.

Other games
Some games that can be played with dance pads do not involve pressing the arrow buttons on the pad to keep with the rhythm of a song:
 Many games developed for the NES Power Pad
 Breakthrough Gaming Presents: Axel
 The minigames of Dance Dance Revolution: Mario Mix (Gamecube)
Active Life series for Wii (Active Life: Outdoor Challenge, Active Life: Explorer, Active Life: Extreme Challenge, Active Life: Magical Carnival)
 Kraft Rocking the Boat
 Kraft Soccer Striker
 Kraft Virtual Dojo
 Exult - using Dance Pad Walking controller mod
 DDR-A-Mole, a game similar to Whac-A-Mole
 Various mini-games in Dance Praise 2: The ReMix (DanceTris, a Tetris simulator, is included).
 The 2014 rogue-like rhythm game Crypt of the NecroDancer and some other games on Steam like The Metronomicon: Slay the Dance Floor'' (RPG elements in addition to dancing) and Vectronom
Indie games with dance pad support on Itch.io

References
Byrne, Michelle. "Console players win on their points" - An article about 'keep-fit' women buying dance pads to help with losing weight. Western Mail, 2004.

 
Game controllers